The People's Railroad was a street railway chartered in 1887 and opened for business in 1889 in Syracuse, New York. In 1896, the company merged into Syracuse Rapid Transit Railway.

References

Defunct railroads in Syracuse, New York
Defunct New York (state) railroads
Railway companies established in 1887
Railway companies disestablished in 1896